Agbaba is a Serbian surname. Notable people with the surname include:

 Jelena Agbaba (born 1997), Serbian handball player
 Marija Agbaba (born 1995), Serbian handball player

Serbian surnames